, pronounced "(t)soom (t)soom", is a range of Japanese collectible stuffed toys based upon Disney-owned characters. The name is derived from the Japanese verb tsumu meaning "to stack", because the rectangle-shaped toys are designed to stack on top of each other, forming a pyramid shape. There are also vinyl versions of them manufactured by Jakks Pacific.

The toys were first released in Japan in 2013 as a tie-in to the Tsum Tsum arcade and mobile games respectively developed by Konami and Line Corporation. Disney began selling them in the United States in July 2014, and in Disneyland Paris the following month. Around the same time, Disney released Tsum Tsum to the South Korean market, giving away icons for use on online chat systems. As of 2014, 1.8 million Tsum Tsum toys have been sold. Disney Tsum Tsum Festival, a party game based on the toyline developed by B.B. Studio and Hyde and published by Bandai Namco Entertainment, was released for Nintendo Switch where you can play up to 4 players and play minigames as a Tsum Tsum.

Design 
Tsum Tsum toys are typically made of felt, microbeads, and stuffing, although hard plastic models can also be found. They are ovular in shape, and vary in sizes. Initially, the toys were released in three different sizes: "mini" ( long), "medium", and "large". In June 2014, a new "mega" size was released to the Japanese market. In October 2015, Disney announced a subscription-only "small" size. In November 2015, during the Japanese D23 Expo, a new "micro" size was introduced.

Characters 
Disney offers dozens of characters in the Tsum Tsum line. The line includes classic mainline characters like Mickey Mouse, Minnie Mouse, Donald Duck, Daisy Duck, Chip 'n' Dale, Pluto and Goofy, as well as secondary Disney characters like Bambi, Pinocchio, Lady, Tramp, Tinker Bell, Cinderella, and others. Contemporary characters are also represented, including those from Lilo & Stitch,  Winnie the Pooh, Toy Story, Monsters, Inc., Big Hero 6, The Aristocats, Phineas and Ferb, Star Wars, and Cars. There are also Marvel characters that are represented, such as Spider-Man, Hulk, Iron Man, Doctor Strange and others.

Disney has also released alternate character representations for holidays and special events.

On 1 August 2019, the original members of the English rock band Queen—Freddie Mercury, Brian May, Roger Taylor, and John Deacon—were added to the Japanese version of the mobile game as Tsum Tsums, with the first three added as playable characters. Selecting any of playable members in the game will have an instrumental version of their respectively written signature songs playing in the background; Mercury features "We Are the Champions", May features "We Will Rock You", and Taylor features "Radio Ga Ga". The band appears in the game as representatives for the 2018 20th Century Fox film Bohemian Rhapsody. The Tsums are exclusive to the Japanese version only.

There is also a CGI animated short series featuring the characters.

Mobile games

Disney Tsum Tsum 

Disney Tsum Tsum (promoted as LINE: Disney Tsum Tsum) is a free-to-play mobile puzzle game for iOS and Android developed and published by Line Corporation. The game focuses on Disney, Pixar, and Star Wars characters rendered as Tsum Tsum toys. The game is divided between two different versions which differ in content; the original Japanese version, and a separate global version. Both versions are regularly updated separately from one another. The game requires a constant Internet connection to play.

As of February 4, 2019, the game reached  in lifetime revenue, of which 96% came from Japan, bringing total franchise revenue to around  including merchandise sales.

In February 2022, the game shut down all operations in Russia due to their invasion of Ukraine.

Gameplay 
The game's story is that Disney Tsum Tsum toys have fallen from the shelves of the Disney Store overnight and need to be put back on the shelves before the store opens. Players must drag their finger on their phone's touchscreen to connect at least three Tsums in order to clear them from the playfield, clearing as many Tsums as possible before time runs out. As Tsums are cleared, players score points, and more of the toys fall in from above. Players score more points (as well as coins to buy new Tsums and raise their score level caps) when clearing four or more tsums at a time. Clearing at least seven Tsums (six when a specific boost is activated before a game) will also spawn a magical bubble (known as a bomb in the Japanese version) that immediately clears surrounding Tsums when tapped to pop them. As Tsums are cleared, they fill up a "Fever Meter" that, when full, triggers a ten-second "Fever Mode", which adds five seconds of playtime to the timer, clears away Tsums faster, and temporarily prevent combos from breaking. In addition, clearing "MyTsums" (a Tsum that players select before each game) fills a meter that allows players to use their MyTsum's special ability.

There are two types of Tsums: Happiness Box Tsums and Premium Box Tsums. Happiness Boxes, which cost 10,000 coins each, contain one of fourteen Tsums from the Mickey & Friends, Chip 'n' Dale, or Winnie the Pooh franchises. Premium Boxes contain one of an ever-increasing number of Tsums, most of which are earned by spending 30,000 coins each, although some of these Tsums can only be earned via specific methods or events, not through a Premium Box purchase. Premium Box Tsums have stronger skills than the Happiness Box Tsums and usually have a skill level cap of six (Happiness Box Tsums have a skill level cap of just three). Also, for certain periods of time, there may be a second option for purchasing Premium Box Tsums in either Pick-Up Capsules (called Pick-Up Gachas in the Japanese version) or Select Boxes. Pick-Up Capsules contain fifteen or twenty specific Tsums for players to earn, with players being awarded a Skill Ticket—an item that allows players to increase the skill levels of any Tsum that they already have in their collection for free—if they empty the dispenser before its availability period ends. Select Boxes contain upwards of ten or twelve Tsums, providing an increased chance of winning Tsums available in such boxes compared to buying them in the regular Premium Boxes.

Players also have in-game bingo cards that award prizes when certain optional missions are completed. Completing a row, column or diagonal line of optional missions for bingo will award players various minor prizes, while completing an entire card will earn players tickets for free Tsums (without having to spend coins), special Tsums (including those that cannot be earned through regular means, such as Oswald the Lucky Rabbit or the Alien from Toy Story), or Skill Tickets, depending on the card. Various time-limited events also award similar prizes through completing separate sets of missions.

Playing a round of Disney Tsum Tsum costs one "heart" (life). Hearts can be earned by waiting fifteen minutes to refill (up to five hearts in total; anymore than four stockpiled hearts will disable refilling until players have less than five hearts again), completing bingos or event missions, spending "Rubies" (the game's premium currency that can be purchased through microtransactions or earned through either leveling up or completing bingos), or by sending hearts to Line and Facebook friends who are logged into the game. Players can send one free heart to each friend per hour. Sending hearts do not cost any players their own hearts. Claiming a heart within an hour of being sent will also award players 200 coins.

Marvel Tsum Tsum 

Marvel Tsum Tsum was a free-to-play mobile puzzle game for iOS and Android developed by XFLAG and published by mixi. The game focuses on Marvel characters rendered as Tsum Tsum toys. Despite having similar gameplay, the game is unrelated to Line Corporation's Disney Tsum Tsum. The game was released worldwide on August 31, 2016 and was shut down on October 31, 2017.

References

External links 
 Official Disney Website
 Jakks Pacific, Inc. (Vinyl Collection)

Android (operating system) games
Arcade video games
Disney Consumer Products franchises
Disney merchandise
IOS games
Konami games
Video games developed in Japan